Michael Angottitauruq Sr. (born 1951) is a former territorial and municipal level politician. He served as Mayor of Gjoa Haven and as a Member of the Legislative Assembly of the Northwest Territories from 1987 to 1989.

Angottitauruq was elected to the Kitikmeot East electoral district in the 1983 Northwest Territories general election. His district became the Natilikmiot electoral district in 1985. He stood for re-election to a second term in the 1987 Northwest Territories general election. He vacated his seat in 1989.

References

External links
Ningark will not seek re-election in Nunavut, Nunatsiaq News October 2, 1998

Members of the Legislative Assembly of the Northwest Territories
People from Gjoa Haven
Inuit from the Northwest Territories
Inuit politicians
Living people
1951 births
Mayors of places in Nunavut
Inuit from Nunavut